Rondout Reservoir is part of New York City's water supply network. It is the central collection point for the city's Delaware System, which provides half its daily consumption.

History
The reservoir was made possible by the construction of Merriman Dam along Rondout Creek. Construction began in 1937 and ended in 1954, three years after the reservoir began delivering water. It would be the first of four built by the city to satisfy its growing demand in the years after World War II. Three villages – Lackawack, Montela and Eureka – were condemned and flooded in the process. The small settlement of Grahamsville remains in existence just west of the reservoir.

In 1998, the city's Department of Environmental Protection (DEP) issued an advisory warning against eating more than one reservoir-caught smallmouth bass per month after mercury levels of 1.3 part per million (ppm), slightly above the federal standard of 1.0 ppm, were confirmed in three caught in the reservoir. Since there is no industry in the reservoir's vast watershed, this contamination is believed to be the result of acid rain from coal-fired power plants in the Midwest.

Forged dam inspections controversy
In 2006, after residents raised concerns regarding the soundness of both Merriman and Neversink dams following emergency repairs to Schoharie Dam, a local newspaper, the Times Herald-Record, obtained copies of weekly visual inspection reports for both and found that the handwriting and information relating to the appearance of the dams on weekly reports compiled by inspector Ronald Hewlett and initialed by section engineer Russell Betters over a three-year period were virtually identical, suggesting they had been routinely photocopied.  The two were later suspended.

Statistics

It holds , which comes not only from the reservoir's own 95 square-mile (247 km2) watershed but from Cannonsville, Neversink, and Pepacton reservoirs via the Delaware and Neversink tunnels as well. Since those three are in the Delaware River watershed, Rondout is considered by the city's Department of Environmental Protection to be part of the Delaware system despite being firmly within the Hudson River watershed itself.

Access and recreational use

Rondout is easy to reach via road as routes 55 and 55A form a loop around it. However, access to the actual reservoir is tightly restricted and has been even more so since the September 11, 2001 attacks forced an increase in security.

Fishing is permitted in season with a DEP-issued permit in addition to the appropriate New York state license, and the reservoir is known, as are most Catskill fishing areas, for its trout. However boats are not allowed to leave the reservoir for environmental reasons and must be stored near it year round. Hunters with valid city and state permits may also use the lands around the reservoir where hunting is permitted during the season. Beyond those, however, no recreational use of the reservoir is permitted. While the land is not fenced off, the area is regularly patrolled by uniformed DEP police.

See also

 List of crossings of Rondout Creek
 List of dams and reservoirs in New York

References

External links
Official nyc.gov page

Reservoirs in New York (state)
Catskill/Delaware watersheds
Rondout Creek
Protected areas of Ulster County, New York
Protected areas of Sullivan County, New York
Catskill Park
Reservoirs in Ulster County, New York
Reservoirs in Sullivan County, New York
1950s establishments in New York (state)